Lakshmi Mazumdar of Delhi was the National Commissioner of the Indian Scouting organization Bharat Scouts and Guides from November 1964 to April 1983, and supervised the construction of the Sangam World Girl Guide/Girl Scout Centre, which was inaugurated on 16 October 1966 by the World Chief Guide, Lady Olave Baden-Powell.

Mazumdar joined Guiding at a very young age in 1922. After India's independence, she held increasingly high responsibilities. In 1969 Mazumdar was awarded the Bronze Wolf, the only distinction of the World Organization of the Scout Movement, awarded by the World Scout Committee for exceptional services to world Scouting.

She received the Padma Shri in 1965.

References

External links
 http://www.bsgindia.org/

Year of birth missing
Possibly living people
Recipients of the Bronze Wolf Award
Scouting and Guiding in India
Recipients of the Padma Shri in social work
Social workers
20th-century Indian educators
20th-century Indian women
Scholars from Delhi
Women educators from Delhi
Educators from Delhi
Social workers from Delhi
20th-century women educators